Maja Helena Nilsson (born 8 December 1999) is a Swedish athlete who specializes in the high jump.

Nilsson gained her first international experience at the European Youth Olympic Festival (EYOF) 2015 in Tbilisi where she won the silver medal in the high jump with a jump of 1.80 metres. She also competed at the 2018 U20 World Championships in Tampere, and at the 2019 European Athletics U23 Championships in Gävle.

In 2021 Nilsson became Swedish high jump indoor champion, and on 30 June 2021 she jumped 1.96 metres to meet the Olympic qualifying standard for the delayed 2020 Summer Games in Tokyo where Nilsson reached the final and finished thirteenth.

References

1999 births
Living people
Swedish female high jumpers
Athletes (track and field) at the 2020 Summer Olympics
Olympic athletes of Sweden
21st-century Swedish women